Liu Xiang, posthumously named Prince Ping of Liang, was a prince of the Han dynasty. He was the son and heir of Liu Mai, and a grandson of Liu Wu, who sided with the imperial court during the Rebellion of the Seven States. Liu Xiang ruled Liang in 137–97 BC.

References

Prince of Liang